Patricia Anne Gaughan (born October 21, 1953) is the Chief United States district judge of the United States District Court for the Northern District of Ohio.

Education and career

Born in Lakewood, Ohio, Gaughan received a Bachelor of Arts degree from Saint Mary's College in 1975 and a Juris Doctor from Notre Dame Law School in 1978. She was an assistant prosecuting attorney of the Criminal Trial Division, Cuyahoga County Prosecutor's Office, Ohio from 1978 to 1983 and from 1984 to 1987. She was an Assistant United States Attorney of the Economic Crime Division, Northern District of Ohio from 1983 to 1984. She was an adjunct professor at Cleveland Marshall College of Law, Cleveland State University from 1983 to 1987, and was in private practice in Cleveland from 1984 to 1987. She was a judge of the Cuyahoga County Court of Common Pleas from 1987 to 1995.

Federal judicial service

On September 29, 1995, Gaughan was nominated by President Bill Clinton to a seat on the United States District Court for the Northern District of Ohio vacated by Ann Aldrich. Gaughan was confirmed by the United States Senate on December 22, 1995, and received her commission on December 26, 1995. She became Chief Judge on June 1, 2017.

References

Sources

1953 births
Living people
20th-century American judges
21st-century American judges
20th-century American women judges
21st-century American women judges
Assistant United States Attorneys
Cleveland State University faculty
Judges of the United States District Court for the Northern District of Ohio
Notre Dame Law School alumni
Ohio state court judges
People from Lakewood, Ohio
Saint Mary's College (Indiana) alumni
United States district court judges appointed by Bill Clinton